David Schuman (May 8, 1944 – October 8, 2019) was an American attorney, who served as a judge of the Oregon Court of Appeals from 2001 to 2014.

Early life and education
Born in the Chicago suburb of Glencoe, Illinois, Schuman came in second in the North American speed skating finals in the 220 yard competition at the age of 17.  He graduated from New Trier High School in 1962, and received a Bachelor of Arts degree in psychology from Stanford University in 1966.  He entered the University of California, Hastings College of the Law but dropped out after six weeks, instead enrolling in San Francisco State University, where he received a Master of Arts degree in 1968.

Academic and judicial career
After leaving San Francisco State, he taught English at Santa Clara University.  He left Santa Clara after two years to return to his native Illinois and earned a Ph.D. in English literature from the University of Chicago in 1974.  He returned to California to teach literature at Deep Springs College but left teaching in 1981 to attend law school, receiving a J.D. from the University of Oregon School of Law in 1984.

After leaving the University of Oregon School of Law, Schuman clerked for Oregon Supreme Court Justice Hans A. Linde from 1984 to 1985. He then became an Assistant Attorney General in the Appellate Division of the Oregon Department of Justice from 1985 to 1987.  He left the Justice Department in 1987 to teach law at the University of Oregon School of Law and was the school's Associate Dean for Academic Affairs from 1994 to 1996.  He left the University of Oregon School of Law in 1997 when he was appointed as Oregon's Deputy Attorney General under Hardy Myers.

In 2001, he again left the Justice Department to return to teaching at the University of Oregon School of Law, where he was promoted to full professor. He left the school again later that year, after having been appointed to the Oregon Court of Appeals by governor John Kitzhaber. Schuman was elected to a full six-year term in 2002 and again in 2008.

Schuman retired from the Court of Appeals in February 2014, and returned to teaching at the UO's School of Law in 2015.

Awards and honors
David Frohnmayer Award for Public Service, 2014

Death and legacy

Schuman died on October 8, 2019, due to injuries sustained in an October 5 bicycle crash in Eugene, Oregon.

In 2021, a memorial bench for Schuman was installed at the Mohawk General Store in Mohawk, Oregon.

Schuman's wife of 51 years, Sharon, compiled his writings in A Voice for Justice: Writings of David Schuman.

References

External links
Obituary from Deep Springs College
Remembrance from the University of Oregon
"Riding with the Judge" by Robert G. Rocklin

1944 births
2019 deaths
21st-century American judges
Cycling road incident deaths
Deep Springs College faculty
Jewish American academics
Jewish American attorneys
Oregon Court of Appeals judges
People from Eugene, Oregon
People from Glencoe, Illinois
San Francisco State University alumni
Santa Clara University faculty
Stanford University alumni
University of Chicago alumni
University of Oregon School of Law alumni
University of Oregon School of Law faculty
21st-century American Jews